Remo Forlani (1927–2009) was a French writer and screenwriter born in Paris to a French mother and an Italian immigrant father.

In 1987 he was awarded the Grand Prix du Théâtre de l'Académie française.

Selected filmography
 Juliette and Juliette (1974)

References

External links

1927 births
2009 deaths
20th-century French non-fiction writers
21st-century French non-fiction writers
French film critics
French film directors
French radio personalities
French male screenwriters
20th-century French screenwriters
French people of Italian descent
Writers from Paris
20th-century French male writers
French male non-fiction writers